Dizaj-e Dowl (also Romanized as Dīzaj-e Dowl, Dīzaj-e Dūl, Dīzaj Dūl, and Dīzaj-e Daowl; also known as Dīzaj and Dizeh) is a Kurdish village in Dul Rural District of the Central District of Urmia County, West Azerbaijan province, Iran. At the 2006 National Census, its population was 714 in 188 households. The following census in 2011 counted 713 people in 232 households. The latest census in 2016 showed a population of 768 people in 233 households; it was the largest village in its rural district.

References 

Urmia County

Populated places in West Azerbaijan Province

Populated places in Urmia County